NGC 1533 is a barred lenticular galaxy with faint spiral structure in the constellation Dorado. The seventh-brightest member of the Dorado Group and 1° off the group's center, it is surrounded by a vast arc or ring of H I which is connected to IC 2038 and IC 2039. The ring orbits around 32 kpc from the center. As is typical of lenticular galaxies,  star formation is weak in NGC 1533. Using both the surface brightness fluctuation (SBF) and globular cluster luminosity function (GCLF) methods, its distance was estimated in 2007 to be 19.4 ± 1.1 Mpc and 18.6 ± 2.0 Mpc respectively. Averaging these together gives a distance of around 19 million parsecs or 62 million light-years from earth. In 1970, a supernova was detected in NGC 1533.

NGC 1533 was discovered by John Herschel on December 5, 1834.

Notes

average(19.4 ± 1.1, 18.6 ± 2.0) = ((19.4 + 18.6) / 2) ± ((1.12 + 2.02)0.5 / 2) = 19.0 ± 1.1
35 kpc calculated assuming a distance of 21 Mpc converts to a distance of 32 (35 ÷ 21 × 19) kpc for the current distance estimate of 19 Mpc

References

External links

 
 Sky View image of NGC 1533

Barred lenticular galaxies
Dorado (constellation)
Dorado Group
Ring galaxies
1533
14582
Discoveries by John Herschel
Astronomical objects discovered in 1834